Senator Brewer may refer to:

Earl L. Brewer (1869–1942), Mississippi State Senate
Jan Brewer (born 1944), Arizona State Senate
Mark S. Brewer (1837–1901), Michigan State Senate
Stephen Brewer (born 1948), Massachusetts State Senate